Sándor Tótka (born 27 July 1994) is a Hungarian canoeist, Olympic champion in Men's 200m Kayak Single at 2020 Summer Olympics. He competed in the men's K-2 200 metres event at the 2016 Summer Olympics.

See also
List of Youth Olympic Games gold medalists who won Olympic gold medals

References

External links
 

1994 births
Living people
Hungarian male canoeists
Olympic canoeists of Hungary
Canoeists at the 2016 Summer Olympics
Sportspeople from Jász-Nagykun-Szolnok County
Canoeists at the 2010 Summer Youth Olympics
ICF Canoe Sprint World Championships medalists in kayak
People from Mezőtúr
Canoeists at the 2015 European Games
European Games medalists in canoeing
European Games bronze medalists for Hungary
Canoeists at the 2019 European Games
Youth Olympic gold medalists for Hungary
Medalists at the 2020 Summer Olympics
Olympic gold medalists for Hungary
Olympic medalists in canoeing
Canoeists at the 2020 Summer Olympics
20th-century Hungarian people
21st-century Hungarian people